WMC-FM (99.7 MHz, "FM100") is a commercial hot adult contemporary radio station licensed to Memphis, Tennessee, serving the Memphis metropolitan area and much of surrounding West Tennessee, northern Mississippi, and eastern Arkansas. Owned by Audacy, Inc. The WMC-FM studios are located in Memphis' Colonial Acres neighborhood, while the station transmitter resides in northeast Memphis. Besides a standard analog transmission, WMC-FM is also available online via Audacy.

Founded by The Commercial Appeal, WMC-FM is notable for being an FM "superpower station," with an output exceeding Federal Communications Commission (FCC) restrictions; of FM stations operating in the FCC's Zone II, WMC-FM is the most powerful.

History
The Memphis Publishing Company, a subsidiary of Scripps-Howard Newspapers which owned the Memphis Commercial Appeal and founded WMC (790 AM), launched this station as WMCF on May 22, 1947. WMCF was the first FM station established in Memphis and the second in the state of Tennessee, after WSM-FM in Nashville, which began in 1941. From its establishment, WMCF had an output of 515,000 watts; this would be adjusted multiple times before settling at its current power output of 300,000 watts. As the FM adjunct to WMC, WMCF largely simulcast the AM station's programming.

On December 11, 1948, a TV station was added, WMCT. WMC, WMCF and WMCT moved to studios at 1960 Union Avenue in Midtown Memphis in 1959 and celebrated with a broadcast hosted by comedian George Gobel. WMCF changed its call sign to WMC-FM on May 27, 1960; WMCT would become WMC-TV in 1967.

WMC-FM was the first FM radio station in the market, and the first in Tennessee, to play progressive rock, beginning February 6, 1967. Personalities on the station included Greg Hamilton, Ron Michaels, Jon Scott, David Day, and the program director was Mike Powell. Artists included the likes of King Crimson, It's a Beautiful Day, and Quicksilver Messenger Service. The versions of "Light My Fire" by The Doors and "In-A-Gadda-Da-Vida" by Iron Butterfly (with its extended drum solo) were longer than the one most stations played.  In the early 1970s, the station was responsible for regionally breaking many new artists such as David Bowie, Alice Cooper, Lynyrd Skynyrd, ZZ Top and Billy Joel. By 1978, WMC-FM had evolved to a Top 40 format, which would transition to a hot adult contemporary format by September 1992.

Scripps Howard sold WMC, WMC-FM and WMC-TV to Atlanta businessman Bert Ellis in 1993. Ellis, in turn, sold his station group in the spring quarter of 1996 to a new broadcasting group formed by the Retirement Systems of Alabama, also composed of Aflac's broadcast holdings and Ellis' Raycom Sports operations; this was subsequently named Raycom Media.

Raycom Media sold off WMC and WMC-FM in 2000 to Infinity Broadcasting, a subsidiary of CBS Radio, while keeping WMC-TV. In 2006, Entercom Communications purchased WMC and WMC-FM from CBS Radio; this preceded both companies merging a decade later. WMC and WMC-FM relocated to the Entercom complex in the Moriah Woods Business Park, near the intersection of I-240 and Mount Moriah Road in eastern Memphis.

Superpower status
Current FCC restrictions were passed in 1962 and mandate a maximum 100,000 watts across most of the country on the FM band, with most of the Northeast and much of California limited to 50,000 watts.  WMC-FM is calculated to exceed power restrictions by 4.6 decibels. However, WMC-FM was grandfathered at the high power since it went on the air before the restrictions began.

Personalities
WMC-FM personalities include the morning team of Ryan Anderson and Erin Austin; Jill Bucco at middays; Chris Michaels in afternoons; Chase Daniels in evenings; and Bennett Doyle in overnights. WMC-FM also carries the "Acoustic Sunrise" on weekends.

Many of the station's air personalities worked there for a decade or longer.  Most notably, Ron "Hey Now" Olson had been the station's morning host since the 1980s, partnered with Steve Conley for some of that time, until leaving the station to join co-owned WRVR. Tom Prestigiacomo had been the afternoon host since 1979, staying for nearly three decades; Prestigiacomo left in 2007 for rival AC outlet WKIM.

References

External links

MC-FM
Audacy, Inc. radio stations
Hot adult contemporary radio stations in the United States
Radio stations established in 1947
1947 establishments in Tennessee